Nevernes is a village in the municipality of Rana in Nordland county, Norway. European route E06 and the Nordland Line both pass through the village. Nevernes Church is located in this village.

References

Rana, Norway
Villages in Nordland